Anna Olimpia Mostowska, née Radziwiłł  (c. 1762, Nieśwież - 1810, Zasław), was a Polish writer. She published her first historical novel in 1807. Her name derives from her second husband, the Polish writer and statesman, Tadeusz Mostowski.

Works
 1806 Moje rozrywki
 Volume I   Strach w Zameczku; Posąg i Salamandra (translated from Christoph Martin Wieland);
 Volume II  Matylda i Daniło; Cudowny szafir (translated from Stéphanie Félicité, comtesse de Genlis);
 Volume III Zamek Koniecpolskich; Nie zawsze tak się czyni, jak się mówi;
 1807 Astolda
 1809 Zabawki w spoczynku po trudach
 Pokuta (translated from Genlis);
 Historya filozoficzna Adyla;
 Sen wróżebny;
 Miłość i Psyche (translated from Apuleius);
 Lewita z Efraim (after Napoleon Lemercière)

References

 Barbara Czwórnóg – Jadczak: Anna Mostowska – polska twórczyni powieści grozy, Express Press, Lublin 2015

1760s births
Year of birth uncertain
1810 deaths

19th-century Polish novelists
19th-century Polish women writers